Nawamidanda  is a village development committee in Panchthar District in the Province No. 1 of eastern Nepal. At the time of the 1991 Nepal census it had a population of 4254 people living in 734 individual households.

References

 Populated places in Panchthar District

External links
Postal code of Nawamidanda